|- style="vertical-align: top;"
| Distance 
| 

SGR 1900+14 is a soft gamma repeater (SGR), located in the constellation of Aquila about 20,000 light-years away. It is assumed to be an example of an intensely magnetic star, known as a magnetar. It is thought to have formed after a fairly recent supernova explosion.

An intense gamma-ray burst from this star was detected on August 27, 1998; shortly thereafter a new radio source appeared in that region of the sky. Despite the large distance to this SGR, estimated at 20,000 light years, the burst had large effects on the Earth's atmosphere. The atoms in the ionosphere, which are usually ionized by the Sun's radiation by day and recombine to neutral atoms by night, were ionized at nighttime at levels not much lower than the normal daytime level. The Rossi X-ray Timing Explorer (RXTE), an X-ray satellite, received its strongest signal from this burst at this time, even though it was directed at a different part of the sky, and should normally have been shielded from the radiation.

NASA's Spitzer Space Telescope detected a mysterious ring around SGR 1900+14 at two narrow infrared frequencies in 2005 and 2007. The 2007 Spitzer image showed no discernible change in the ring after two years. The ring measures seven light-years across. The origin of the ring is currently unknown and is the subject of an article in the May 29, 2008 issue of the journal Nature.

References

External links
Image SGR 1900+14

Aquila (constellation)
Soft gamma repeaters
Astronomical X-ray sources
Magnetars